Alfredo Akio Tamashiro Noborikawa is a Peruvian karateka who has won several medals including a bronze in Individual kata at the 2010 World Karate Championships in Belgrade.

References

External links
 

Year of birth missing (living people)
Living people
Peruvian male karateka
Peruvian people of Japanese descent
World Games bronze medalists
Pan American Games medalists in karate
Competitors at the 2001 World Games
Competitors at the 2005 World Games
Pan American Games bronze medalists for Peru
Karateka at the 1999 Pan American Games
Karateka at the 2003 Pan American Games
National University of San Marcos alumni
World Games medalists in karate
Medalists at the 1999 Pan American Games
Medalists at the 2003 Pan American Games